Hunter Gatherer is the eighth studio album by Swedish heavy metal band Avatar, released on 7 August 2020.

Background 
The band recorded their eighth studio album at Sphere Studios in Burbank, California, US, with additional overdubs at Suomenlinnan Studio in Helsinki, Finland, and Spinroad Studios in Lindome, Sweden. Jay Ruston returned as producer; he had produced the band's previous album Avatar Country.

Song information 
Avatar released their first music video of the album for the song "Silence in the Age of Apes" on 14 May 2020. The song was said to be inspired by a book by Yuval Noah Harari called Sapiens: A Brief History of Humankind. The band later released a music video for "Colossus".

Track listing

Personnel 
 Jonas "Kungen" Jarlsby – guitars
 John Alfredsson – drums
 Johannes Eckerström – lead vocals
 Henrik Sandelin – bass, backing vocals
 Tim Öhrström – guitars, backing vocals

Charts

References 

2020 albums
Avatar (Swedish band) albums